Goku is the main character in Dragon Ball media.

Goku may also refer to:
 Goku (footballer), a Spanish soccer player
 Goku (Monkey Typhoon), the main character in Monkey Typhoon manga and anime series
 Goku (Saiyuki) in the Saiyuki manga and anime series
 Goku (Yūyūki), a character in the Yūyūki video game
 The Japanese numeral for 
 Goku, a novel by Shimaki Kensaku
 Furinji Goku, the title character in the Goku Midnight Eye manga and anime series
 Goku Black, a character from Dragon Ball Super
 GOKU.to, a streaming website

See also
 Son Goku (disambiguation)
 Gokū no Daibōken
 Gokū Gaiden! Yūki no Akashi wa Sì Xīng Qiú
 Dragon Ball Z: Goku RPG (series)